The Ninety-Third Arkansas General Assembly is the legislative body of the state of Arkansas in 2021 and 2022. The Arkansas Senate and Arkansas House of Representatives were both controlled by the Republicans. In the Senate, 28 senators were Republicans and 7 were Democrats. In the House, 78 representatives were Republicans and 22 were Democrats.

Sessions
The Regular Session of the 93rd General Assembly opened on January 11, 2021.  It recessed due to two extreme winter storms (February 15 and February 17 in Arkansas) for the week of February 15. It adjourned sine die on April 24, 2019.
 The Fiscal Session began February 14, 2022 and concluded March 15.
 Governor Asa Hutchinson called for a special session to begin August 9, 2022 to lower the top income tax rate to 4.9% following a large state surplus. Bipartisan calls to use part of the surplus to raise teacher were ultimately ignored.

Major events

Corruption and scandals
 Senators Mark Johnson (R-15th) and Alan Clark (R-13th) were punished for violating Senate Ethics rules on July 21, 2022. Johnson signed a sign-in sheet for Clark during a meeting he did not attend, and subsequently requesting reimbursement.
 Senator Alan Clark (R-13th) was suspended in a vote of the Senate for making "spurious, frivolous and retaliatory charges of ethics violations" against Senator Stephanie Flowers (D-25th).

Vacancies and party changes
 Senator Jim Hendren (R-2nd) left the Republican Party of Arkansas and became an independent politician on February 18 citing the party's reaction to the 2021 storming of the United States Capitol and President Donald Trump's behavior. The announcement drew national attention.

Senator Lance Eads (R-7th) resigned on October 28, 2021. Colby Fulfer (R) won a special election on February 8, 2022 and was sworn in on February 22, 2022.

Major legislation
The legislature was prolific during the regular session, considering 684 Senate bills and 986 House bills. A total of 1,100 bills become law.

Some culture war issues were considered in this session, including transgender people in sports.

Senate

Leadership

Officers

Floor Leaders

Senators

House of Representatives

Leadership

Officers

Floor Leaders

Representatives

References

Arkansas legislative sessions
Arkansas
Arkansas